McKay Andrew Christensen (born August 14, 1975) is a former Major League Baseball outfielder.

Christensen played for three different ballclubs during his career: the Chicago White Sox (1999–2001), Los Angeles Dodgers (2001), and New York Mets (2002).  He made his Major League Baseball debut on April 6, 1999.  Christensen last played in a Major League game on April 7, 2002 and is now retired and working as a real estate developer.

Christensen is a member of the Church of Jesus Christ of Latter-day Saints, and reportedly passed up a million-dollar signing bonus in order to serve a mission in Japan. Christensen was originally drafted by the California Angels and was traded to the White Sox while in Japan as a missionary.

Personal life
Christensen's parents are Stephen LaMar Christensen (b. 1949 in Provo, Utah) and Victoria Ann "Vicki" (nee Swan) Christensen (b. 1948 in Los Angeles County, California). His uncle is Utah politician F. LaVar Christensen, and his 3rd great-grandfather is Nathaniel H. Felt, a member of the first Utah State Legislature.

References

External links

1975 births
20th-century Mormon missionaries
American Mormon missionaries in Japan
Chicago White Sox players
Living people
Los Angeles Dodgers players
Major League Baseball center fielders
Baseball players from California
New York Mets players
People from Upland, California
Hickory Crawdads players
Gulf Coast White Sox players
Winston-Salem Warthogs players
Birmingham Barons players
Charlotte Knights players
Las Vegas 51s players
Louisville Bats players
Latter Day Saints from California
Norfolk Tides players
Scranton/Wilkes-Barre Red Barons players